The fourth season of RuPaul's Drag Race All Stars was announced by VH1 on August 22, 2018. Prior to the official announcement, RuPaul confirmed in an episode of his podcast What's the Tee?, that filming for the fourth season was underway. Season 3 winner Trixie Mattel, with special guests Katya Zamolodchikova and Detox, hosted a special, Trixie's Playhouse, to announce the cast for the fourth season. It was scheduled to air on November 8, 2018, but was postponed to the following day due to the Thousand Oaks shooting. The season began airing on December 14, 2018, and ran for ten episodes.

The prizes for the winner of the competition are a one-year supply of Anastasia Beverly Hills Cosmetics and a cash prize of $100,000.

The winners of the fourth season of RuPaul's Drag Race All Stars were Monét X Change and Trinity the Tuck.

Contestants 

Ages, names, and cities stated are at time of filming.

Contestant progress

Lip syncs
Legend:

Notes:

Guest judges
Guest judges for this season include:

Jenifer Lewis, actress, comedian, singer, and activist
Ciara, singer-songwriter, dancer, and model
Kacey Musgraves, singer-songwriter
Gus Kenworthy, freestyler skier and actor
Keiynan Lonsdale, actor, singer-songwriter, and dancer
Erica Ash, actress, comedian, singer, and model
Zoë Kravitz, actress, singer, and model
Cecily Strong, actress and comedian
Yvette Nicole Brown, actress, voice actress, and comedian
Rita Ora, singer-songwriter and actress
Susanne Bartsch, event producer
Ellen Pompeo, actress, director, and producer
Frances Bean Cobain, visual artist and model
Felicity Huffman, actress
Jason Wu, artist and fashion designer
Todrick Hall, actor and singer

Special guests 
Guests who appeared in episodes but did not judge on the main stage (in order of appearance):

Episode 2
Stacy Layne Matthews, contestant from season 3
Leland, singer-songwriter, composer, and record producer
Freddy Scott, composer and actor

Episode 4
Stacy Layne Matthews
Elton John, singer-songwriter and composer

Episode 5
Lady Bunny, drag queen
Stacy Layne Matthews

Episode 10
Chad Michaels, runner up of season four and winner of the first season of All Stars
Alaska, runner up of season five and winner of the second season of All Stars
Trixie Mattel, contestant on season seven and winner of the third season of All Stars

Episodes

Ratings

See also
 Queen of Queens, 2019 remix album featuring "Super Queen"

References

External links
 

2018 American television seasons
2019 American television seasons
RuPaul's Drag Race All Stars seasons
VH1
2018 in LGBT history
2019 in LGBT history